Skartados is a Greek surname. Notable people with the surname include:

Frank Skartados (1956–2018), Greek American politician and businessman
Giorgos Skartados (born 1960), Greek footballer

Greek-language surnames